The 1876 United States presidential election in Kansas took place on November 7, 1876, as part of the 1876 United States presidential election. Voters chose five representatives, or electors to the Electoral College, who voted for president and vice president.

Kansas voted for the Republican nominee, Rutherford B. Hayes, over the Democratic nominee, Samuel J. Tilden. Hayes won the state by a margin of 32.57%.

With 63.10% of the popular vote, Kansas would be Hayes' third strongest victory in terms of percentage in the popular vote after Vermont and Nebraska. With 6.26% of the popular vote, the state would also prove to be Greenback candidate Peter Cooper's best performing state.

Results

See also
 United States presidential elections in Kansas

References

Kansas
1876
1876 Kansas elections